The 2016 Virgin Australia All-Australian team represents the best performed Australian Football League (AFL) players during the 2016 season. It was announced on 1 September as a complete Australian rules football team of 22 players. The team is honorary and does not play any games.

Selection panel
The selection panel for the 2016 All-Australian team consisted of chairman Gillon McLachlan, Kevin Bartlett, Luke Darcy, Mark Evans, Danny Frawley, Glen Jakovich, Cameron Ling, Matthew Richardson and Warren Tredrea.

Team

Initial squad
The initial 40-man squad was announced on 29 August. Adelaide had the most nominations with six, while cross-town rivals  and  both had five nominations each.

Final team
Minor premiers Sydney had the most selections with five.  captain Joel Selwood was announced as the All-Australian captain, with Adelaide midfielder Rory Sloane announced as the vice-captain. The team saw nine players selected in an All-Australian side for the first time in their careers.

Note: the position of coach in the All-Australian team is traditionally awarded to the coach of the premiership team.

References

All-Australian Team